This is a list of newspapers in Kentucky.

Daily and weekly newspapers (currently published)

University newspapers

 College Heights Herald – Western Kentucky University, Bowling Green
 The Concord - Bellarmine University
 The Eastern Progress – Eastern Kentucky University, Richmond
 The Hill - Henderson Community College
 The Kentucky Kernel – University of Kentucky, Lexington
 The Louisville Cardinal - University of Louisville
 The Murray State News - Murray State University
  The Northerner - Northern Kentucky University
 The Patriot Newspaper - University of the Cumberlands
 The Pinnacle – Berea College, Berea
 The Quadrangle - Jefferson Community and Technical College
 The Rambler - Transylvania University
 The Thorobred News - Kentucky State University
 The Trail Blazer - Morehead State University, Morehead

Defunct newspapers

See also
 Kentucky media
 List of radio stations in Kentucky
 List of television stations in Kentucky
 Media of cities in Kentucky: Bowling Green, Lexington, Louisville
 Journalism:
 :Category:Journalists from Kentucky
 Western Kentucky University School of Journalism and Broadcasting (est. 1999), in Bowling Green
 Murray State University Department of Journalism and Mass Communications (est. 1975)
 Kentucky literature

References

Bibliography
  (+ List of titles 50+ years old)
 
 
 
 
 
  (Includes information about weekly rural newspapers in Kentucky)

External links

 
  (Includes Kentucky newspapers) 
 
 
 
 
 
Kentucky Digital Newspaper Program online library of digitized and digital Kentucky newspapers, University of Kentucky Libraries Special Collections Research Center